Shalini Amerasinghe Ganendra is a cultural entrepreneur and scholar recognised for inter-disciplinary programming that has increased focus on creative practises from under-recognised regions. Such programming, including the landmark,city wide cultural marquee,  Gallery Weekend Kuala Lumpur, which she founded in 2016, has given exposure to regional art movements and eco-systems. The marquee has been described as a "pioneering culture-building network."  
Through eponymous cultural organisation Shalini Ganendra Advisory, she also developed multi- and inter-disciplinary modules to enable and galvanise cultural connections, for over two decades. The centre hosted residencies, exhibitions, talks, workshops at site and externally. The seminal public program, Vision Culture Lectures. 
was recognised by UNESCO Observatory as distinguished case study through its publication, Arts in Asia 2016.

She was the first Sri Lankan art expert and collector to be appointed to the Tate Gallery (UK) Acquisitions Committee (SAAC) in 2017 and has served on numerous judging and award panels including for the National Museum of Asian Art, Smithsonian Institution and Commonwealth Art Award. She introduced contemporary Sri Lankan and Malaysian artists to international audiences during New York's Asia Week 2006 -2008 and 2015 through a series of exhibitions: Serendipity and My Country.  She has published widely, including on modern and contemporary art, craft and the relationship between image and identity, specifically focussing on cultural objects as agents of narrative. 

She commissioned one of the earliest green buildings in Malaysia, in 2011 the Gallery Residence, (also known as the Ganendra Art House). The project was twice nominated for the Aga Khan Architecture Award and continues to be studied as an ideal example of tropical green architectural build exemplifying innovation and economy. 

In recognition of her transnational cultural impact and for promoting the culture of encounter, she was awarded the Order of St. Gregory by the Vatican State (2019).

Education
She attended the National Cathedral School, Washington D.C. and Phillips Exeter Academy. The Academy made her a Harkness Fellow in 2007. A fourth generation Cantabrigian, she read law at Trinity Hall, Cambridge University and was featured as one of the THWomen40 prominent women in profile.

Personal life
Shalini Amerasinghe Ganendra is married and has three children.

References

External links
 Shalini Ganendra Advisory.
 Gallery Weekend Kuala Lumpur.

Living people
Art curators
Year of birth missing (living people)